Karsten Braasch and André Sá were the defending champions but did not compete that year.

Jan-Michael Gambill and Graydon Oliver won in the final 6–7 (2–7), 6–4, 7–6 (7–4) against Wayne Arthurs and Andrew Kratzmann.

Seeds
Champion seeds are indicated in bold text while text in italics indicates the round in which those seeds were eliminated.

 Mahesh Bhupathi /  Jonas Björkman (first round)
 Joshua Eagle /  Sandon Stolle (quarterfinals)
 Michael Hill /  Leander Paes (quarterfinals)
 David Adams /  Brian MacPhie (first round)

Draw

External links
 2002 Hong Kong Open Doubles Draw

Hong Kong Open (tennis)
Doubles